Ab ovo (From the egg) is a 1917 painting by Paul Klee (1879–1940) made during his time in the German Army. It is noteworthy for its sophisticated technique. It employs watercolor on gauze and paper with a chalk ground, which produces a rich texture of triangular, circular, and crescent patterns.

The work is in the collection of the Zentrum Paul Klee in Bern, Switzerland.

See also
List of works by Paul Klee

Notes

References

External links

1917 paintings
Paintings by Paul Klee
Paintings of Zentrum Paul Klee